Russia have participated in twelve UEFA European Championships, the second-most among all participants of the Euro after Germany, five of which were as the Soviet Union and one of which was representing the CIS (Commonwealth of Independent States). As the Soviet Union, their best performance was becoming champions in the inaugural 1960 edition in France, while their best performance as Russia came in the 2008 tournament held in Austria and Switzerland, when they reached the semi-finals.

Overview

Overall record
1992– as 

 Champions   Runners-up   Third place   Fourth place

Head-to-head record

1960 European Nations' Cup (as Soviet Union)

Final tournament

Semi-finals

Final

1964 European Nations' Cup (as Soviet Union)

Final tournament

Semi-finals

Final

UEFA Euro 1968 (as Soviet Union)

Final tournament

Semi-finals

Third place play-off

UEFA Euro 1972 (as Soviet Union)

Final tournament

Semi-finals

Final

UEFA Euro 1988 (as Soviet Union)

Group stage

Knockout stage

Semi-finals

Final

UEFA Euro 1992 (as CIS)

Group stage

UEFA Euro 1996

Group stage

UEFA Euro 2004

Group stage

UEFA Euro 2008

Group stage

Knockout phase

Quarter-finals

Semi-finals

UEFA Euro 2012

Group stage

UEFA Euro 2016

Group stage

UEFA Euro 2020

Group stage

Goalscorers

References

 
Countries at the UEFA European Championship